Bezawada Bapanaya Naidou Jr was a grandson of Bezawada Bapanaya Sr., the first Mayor of Yanam, and was himself the mayor from 1925 to 1930. He was one of the two powerful political leaders in Yanam during French rule. It was told that he was very soft-natured person and a vaishnavite.  He was a humble and powerful politician in his time. Bouloussou Soubramaniam Sastroulou who had been Diwan for Manyam Zamindar, was one of his counselors. His opponent was Kamichetty Venugopala Rao Naidou.

Death
Unfortunately, he was murdered in Pondicherry. It was a mystery about his murder. There was a rumour that he knew the real culprits behind the murder of then politician Selvaraj Chettiar. Actually, it was told that he had an insurance policy for him. So, his family members gave a statement that he had died a natural death in order to get that money.

After his death, his faction became weak, and even his siblings were also not able to continue in Yanam politics as he did. There was a street named Bezawada in Yanam. Even today, there is a portrait of Bezawada in the municipal hall at Yanam.

Titles held
Membre du Conseil Municipal de Yanaon
Membre du Conseil Local de Yanaon
Maire de Yanaon

See also
Telugu people
Yanam Municipality
Samatam Krouschnaya
Colonial History of Yanam 
Bouloussou Soubramaniam Sastroulou
Municipal Administration in French India

References

French India
French Hindus
French murder victims
French people of Telugu descent
Indian murder victims
Year of birth missing
Year of death missing
Mayors of Yanam